The 1879 Wimbledon Championships took place on the outdoor grass courts at the All England Lawn Tennis and Croquet Club in Wimbledon, London, United Kingdom. The tournament ran from 7 July until 16 July. It was the 3rd staging of the Wimbledon Championships, and the first Grand Slam tennis event of 1879. The entry for the 1879 all comers' tournament was 45, of whom 36 were newcomers. The all comers' final was watched by 1100 spectators.

Gentlemen's singles

Final

 John Hartley defeated  Frank Hadow, walkover
 This was Hartley's first major.

All Comers' Final
 John Hartley defeated  Vere St. Leger Goold, 6–2, 6–4, 6–2

Second place match
 Vere St. Leger Goold defeated  Cecil Parr, 4–6, 6–2, 5–6, 6–4, 6–4

References

External links
 Official Wimbledon Championships website

 
Wimbledon Championship
Wimbledon Championship
Wimbledon Championship
July 1879 sports events